Verde paisaje del Infierno (Green landscape of Hell) is the sixth album by Argentine rock band Los Piojos, released in 2000.

Track listing 
All tracks by Andrés Ciro Martínez except where noted.

 "María y José" [Mary & Joseph] – 4:38
 "Labios de seda" [Lips of silk] – 4:10
 "Luz de marfil" [Ivory light] – 5:24
 "Vine hasta aquí" [I came up here](Daniel Fernandez) – 4:38
 "Globalización" [Globalization] – 3:43
 "Fijate" [Look] – 3:52
 "Reggae rojo y negro" [Red and black reggae] (Fernandez) – 4:16
 "Ruleta" [Roulette] – 4:16
 "Morella" [Morella] – 4:12
 "La luna y la cabra" [The moon and the goat] – 3:30
 "Media caña" [Half reed] – 5:14
 "Mi babe" [My babe] – 4:42
 "Merecido" [Deserved] – 4:13
 "San Jauretche" [Saint Jauretche] – 5:00

Personnel 
Peteco Carabajal – violin
Sebastian "Roger" Cardero – drums, percussion, backing vocals
Demian Chorovicz – engineer
Fernando Dieguez – drums
Daniel "Piti" Fernandez – guitar, backing vocals
Chango Farías Gómez – percussion
Gustavo Hernan Kupinski – bandoneon, guitar, backing vocals
Nora Lezano – photography
Andrés Ciro Martínez – audio production, backing vocals, flute, guitar, harmonic, percussion, producer, vocals
Ricardo Mollo – guitar, vocals
Miguel Angel Rodriguez – vocals
Alvaro Torres – keyboards, piano
Ricardo Troilo – engineer

External links 
 Verde paisaje del Infierno 

2000 albums
Los Piojos albums